The 1975 Paris–Nice was the 33rd edition of the Paris–Nice cycle race and was held from 8 March to 16 March 1975. The race started in Paris and finished in Nice. The race was won by Joop Zoetemelk of the Gan team.

General classification

References

1975
1975 in road cycling
1975 in French sport
March 1975 sports events in Europe
1975 Super Prestige Pernod